The Shire Hall in Agincourt Square, Monmouth, Wales, is a prominent Grade I listed building in the town centre.  It was built in 1724, and was formerly the centre for the Assize Courts and Quarter Sessions for Monmouthshire.  In 1839–40, the court was the location of the trial of the Chartist leader John Frost and others for high treason for their part in the Newport Rising. The building was also used as a market place. The Shire Hall is owned by Monmouthshire County Council and has audiovisual guides for visitors to Courtroom 1. It is currently used as a Tourist Information Centre and as the offices for Monmouth Town Council, and is open to the public in part.

History

The current building was erected in 1724, and is at least the fourth building on the site.  It had earlier been the site of an Elizabethan court built in 1536, which in turn was replaced in 1571 by a timber-framed construction. The timbers from the original building were used in the construction of the Shire Hall, which provided an open trading area on the ground floor with rooms above.  The building, described in Buildings of Wales as "a mighty affair", is constructed of Bath stone ashlar and was designed by a little-known architect, Philip Fisher (d. 1776) of Bristol at a cost of £1700.  The Courts of Assize were transferred to the building in 1725, with the court room itself located on the first floor above the open arches which were used as a market area.  The clock in the pediment was made by Richard Watkins in 1765.

The interior of the building was remodelled in 1828, and a new exterior stair tower with a glazed lantern was added, enclosing a grandiose new staircase. Thomas Hopper was involved with improvements to the Shire Hall under "Royal assent". He was involved for many years with improvements to Penrhyn Castle, near Bangor. He and Edward Haycock Sr. extended the Shire Hall building along Agincourt Street, creating room for a new staircase and larger courts. Hopper took up residence in Monnow Street in Monmouth while this was happening.

Sculpture of King Henry V

The sculpture of King Henry V, in a niche above the front entrance and below the clock, is generally considered to be of poor quality; variously described as "incongruous", "rather deplorable", "decidedly-bad" and "pathetic..like a hypochondriac inspecting his thermometer". It was added in 1792 by Charles Peart, a professional sculptor who had been born at nearby English Newton.  The inscription reads: HENRY V, BORN AT MONMOUTH, AUG 9TH 1387.  The carved birth date is now thought to be incorrect.

Trial of the Chartist leaders
 
The County Gaol was located a short distance from the court rooms. It was here that the Chartist leader Henry Vincent, who had sought the right of all men to vote in parliamentary elections, was imprisoned before being tried at the assizes. Vincent was convicted, but the unpopularity of the verdict led to protests that eventually led to miners being killed in a clash with the military at Newport on 4 November 1839. John Frost was arrested in Newport shortly after the riot, followed by other leaders of the group.  A Special Commission opened at Shire Hall on 10 December 1839, and an appointed Grand Jury considered what charges to bring against them. The Grand Jury included Lord Granville Somerset, brother of the Duke of Beaufort; John Etherington Welch Rolls; Octavius Morgan; and four Members of Parliament, Joseph Bailey, William Addams Williams, Reginald James Blewitt, and Sir Benjamin Hall.   Frost, William Jones, Zephaniah Williams and five others were duly charged with high treason, and their trial began on 31 December.  It has been described as "one of the most important treason trials in the annals of British law".  The judges were the Lord Chief Justice, Sir Nicholas Tindal; Sir James Parke; and Sir John Williams, who was notorious for sentencing the Tolpuddle Martyrs to transportation in 1834.  Counsel for the Crown was the Attorney General, Sir John Campbell; Frost's counsel was Sir Frederick Pollock.

While the trial was taking place, measures were taken to protect Monmouth against Chartist insurgents.  Troops were billeted at the White Swan, and some were stationed at the gatehouse on the Monnow Bridge.  Granville Somerset and Benjamin Hall spoke in Frost's defence, and, in his summing up, Lord Chief Justice Tindal drew attention to the complete certainty needed for a conviction, suggesting his desire for an acquittal.  All eight men were found guilty, but the jury added a recommendation for mercy.  On 16 January 1840, the judge sentenced Frost, Jones and Williams to be hanged, drawn and quartered; they were the last men in Britain to be sentenced to that punishment.  The other five men were sentenced to transportation.  On the day before they were due to be executed, 29 January, the Cabinet under Lord Melbourne took the advice of Lord Chief Justice Tindal, and asked Queen Victoria to reduce all the sentences to transportation. On 2 February 1840, the prisoners were escorted to Chepstow, and put on the steamer Usk for Portsmouth, where they were transferred to the ship Mandarin with over 200 other prisoners and taken to Van Diemen's Land.

Recent uses
When Monmouthshire County Council was formed in 1889, most of its functions were based at Shire Hall, Newport, which by then was the county's main centre of population, rather than at Monmouth.

The magistrates' court at Shire Hall, Monmouth, closed in 1997, and the county court closed in 2002. Monmouthshire County Council then applied to the Heritage Lottery Fund for resources, and secured a grant of £3.2 million towards the building's complete refurbishment, with further funding of over £1 million provided by the county council.  Renovation started in late 2008, and the restored building was opened in September 2010.  Among the areas open to visitors is the courtroom in which the trial of Frost and others took place in 1840. A key element of the refurbishment was the installation of a lift, which makes the whole building accessible for all. The building now contains a Tourist Information Centre and offices, it is open to the public seven days a week from 10am – 4pm from April to September and is closed on Sundays in winter.

The loft

Surroundings
The Shire Hall and surrounding area were used as a location for the 2008 Doctor Who Christmas special. In Agincourt Square, immediately in front of the Shire Hall, stands a Statue of Charles Rolls, the locally born motoring and aviation pioneer to commemorate his life achievements, it was unveiled in 1911.  The Kings Head Hotel stands opposite, which dates from the mid-17th century and was reputedly visited by Charles I of England in 1645. Other notable buildings in the square include the Beaufort Arms, a former coaching inn dating from the early eighteenth century, the Punch House, another former coaching inn and Agincourt House, a notable early seventeenth century half-timbered building.

See also
List of former county courts in Wales

References

Sources

External links
  - Official web site
 

Buildings and structures in Monmouth, Wales
Government buildings completed in 1724
Grade I listed buildings in Monmouthshire
Government buildings in Monmouthshire
Tourist attractions in Monmouthshire
Grade I listed government buildings
Articles containing video clips
1724 establishments in Wales